Euseius amabilis is a species of mite in the family Phytoseiidae.

References

amabilis
Articles created by Qbugbot
Animals described in 1992